Arnaldo Ribeiro (January 7, 1930–December 15, 2009) was the Roman Catholic Archbishop of the Roman Catholic Archdiocese of Ribeirão Preto, Brazil.

Ordained to the priesthood on March 13, 1954, in the Archdiocese of Belo Horizonte, Ribeiro was named auxiliary bishop of the Belo Horizonte Archdiocese on November 6, 1975, and was ordained bishop on December 27, 1975. On December 28, 1988, Ribeiro was named Archbishop of the Ribeirão Preto Archdiocese; he retired on April 5, 2006.

Six years after the death of Archbp. Ribeiro, the Archdiocese of Ribeirão Preto formally opened his cause for beatification. His current status in the steps towards sainthood is Servant of God.

Notes

21st-century Roman Catholic archbishops in Brazil
1930 births
2009 deaths
Brazilian Servants of God
21st-century venerated Christians
20th-century Roman Catholic archbishops in Brazil
Roman Catholic bishops of Belo Horizonte